The 2000 Ohio State Buckeyes football team represented the Ohio State University in 2000 NCAA Division I-A football season. The Buckeyes compiled an 8–4 record, including a 38–26 loss to rival Michigan in Columbus in the regular season finale and a 24–7 loss to the South Carolina Gamecocks in the 2001 Outback Bowl. The losses dropped head coach John Cooper's record to 2–10–1 in Michigan–Ohio State games and 3–8 in bowl games, contributing to his dismissal from the team on January 2, 2001.

Coaching staff
 John Cooper - Head Coach - 13th year
 George Belu - Offensive Line (1st year)
 Bill Conley - Recruiting Coordinator (14th year)
 Jim Heacock - Defensive Line (5th year)
 Fred Pagac - Assistant Head Coach (19th year)
 Tim Salem -  (4th year)
 Shawn Simms - Defensive Ends (4th year)
 Tim Spencer - Running Backs (7th year)
 Chuck Strobart - Offensive Coordinator (6th year)
 Jon Tenuta - Defensive Coordinator / Defensive Backs (5th year)
 Bob Tucker - Director of Football Operations (6th year)
 Brian Williams - Defense / Special Teams (1st year)

Schedule

Game summaries

Fresno State

Arizona

Miami (OH)

Penn State

Wisconsin

Minnesota

Iowa

Purdue

Michigan State

Illinois

Source: USA Today

Michigan

Outback Bowl

Roster

Rankings

2001 NFL draftees

References

Ohio State
Ohio State Buckeyes football seasons
Ohio State Buckeyes football